General Anders may refer to:

Carl Anders (1893–1972), German Wehrmacht major general
William Anders (born 1933), U.S. Air Force major general
Władysław Anders (1892–1970), Polish Army lieutenant general